The Schwarzwasser is a river in Bohemia (Czech Republic) and Saxony (Germany). It is a left tributary of the Preßnitz, which it joins near Jöhstadt.

See also
List of rivers of Saxony
List of rivers of the Czech Republic

Rivers of Saxony
Rivers of the Ústí nad Labem Region
Rivers of the Ore Mountains
Rivers of Germany
International rivers of Europe